Let There Be Gwar is a collection of the first ever Gwar demo recordings. It was released in 2004. It was also remastered by Cory Smoot at Karma Studios.

Track listing

References

Gwar albums